The 2007–08 season of the División de Honor de Futsal is the 19th season of top-tier futsal in Spain.

Regular season table

*At end of season, Armiñana Valencia & Móstoles 2008 were forced to relegation due to economic limitations.

Championship playoffs

The Finals were broadcast in Spain on RTVE.

Matches

Quarter-finals
(1) ElPozo Murcia Turística vs. (8) Playas de Castellón:
Game 1 6 May @ Murcia: ElPozo Murcia Turística 4-0 Playas de Castellón
Game 2 10 May @ Castellón: Playas de Castellón 2-2 ElPozo Murcia Turística // Pen: 3-5
ElPozo Murcia Turística wins the series 2-0
Total Aggregate: 6-2

(2) Interviú Fadesa vs. (7) Autos Lobelle de Santiago:
Game 1 6 May @ Alcalá de Henares: Interviú Fadesa 4-5 Autos Lobelle de Santiago
Game 2 10 May @ Santiago de Compostela: Autos Lobelle de Santiago 1-4 Interviú Fadesa
Game 3 17 May @ Alcalá de Henares: Interviú Fadesa 5-3 Autos Lobelle de Santiago
Interviú Fadesa wins the series 2-1
Total Aggregate: 13-9

(3) Benicarló Onda Urbana vs. (6) FC Barcelona Senseit:
Game 1 6 May @ Benicarló: Benicarló Onda Urbana 1-7 FC Barcelona Senseit
Game 2 10 May @ Barcelona: FC Barcelona Senseit 4-1 Benicarló Onda Urbana
FC Barcelona Senseit wins the series 2-0
Total Aggregate: 2-11

(4) Carnicer Torrejón vs. (5) Azkar Lugo:
Game 1 6 May @ Torrejón de Ardoz: Carnicer Torrejón 1-3 Azkar Lugo
Game 2 10 May @ Lugo: Azkar Lugo 6-6 Carnicer Torrejón // Pen: 4-5
Game 3 17 May @ Torrejón de Ardoz: Carnicer Torrejón 5-2 Azkar Lugo
Carnicer Torrejón wins the series 2-1
Total Aggregate: 12-11

Semifinals
(1) ElPozo Murcia Turística vs. (4) Carnicer Torrejón:
Game 1 20 May @ Murcia: ElPozo Murcia Turística 3-0 Carnicer Torrejón
Game 2 24 May @ Torrejón de Ardoz: Carnicer Torrejón 1-2 ElPozo Murcia Turística
ElPozo Murcia Turística wins the series 2-0
Total Aggregate: 5-2

(2) Interviú Fadesa vs. (6) FC Barcelona Senseit:
Game 1 20 May @ Alcalá de Henares: Interviú Fadesa 5-2 FC Barcelona Senseit
Game 2 23 May @ Barcelona: FC Barcelona Senseit 2-3 Interviú Fadesa
Interviú Fadesa wins the series 2-0
Total Aggregate: 8-4

Final
(1) ElPozo Murcia Turística vs. (2) Interviú Fadesa:
Game 1 31 May @ Murcia: ElPozo Murcia Turística 1-3 Interviú Fadesa
Game 2 7 June @ Alcalá de Henares: Interviú Fadesa 8-5 ElPozo Murcia Turística
Interviú Fadesa wins the series 2-0
Total Aggregate: 6-11
CHAMPION: : Inteviú Fadesa

Top goal scorers

As day 30 of 30

TV Coverage
TVE2
Teledeporte
Barça TV
Punt 2
Telecartagena
Aragón Televisión
Canal 33
IB3

External links
2007–08 season at lnfs.es

See also
División de Honor de Futsal
Futsal in Spain

2007 08
Division De Honor De Futsal, 2007-08
futsal
2007–08 in Spanish futsal